Chorus is a genus of sea snails, marine gastropod mollusks in the family Muricidae, the murex snails or rock snails.

Species
Species within the genus Chorus include:
 Chorus giganteus (Lesson, 1831)

References

External links
 Gray, J. E. (1847). A list of the genera of recent Mollusca, their synonyma and types. Proceedings of the Zoological Society of London. 15: 129-219. Date of publication November 1847

Ocenebrinae
Monotypic gastropod genera